XETAM-AM/XHTAM-FM is a combo AM/FM radio station in Ciudad Victoria, Tamaulipas. It broadcasts on 640 AM and 96.1 FM and is known as Romántica with a romantic format.

History
XETAM received its first concession on May 4, 1989. The original concessionaire was Promociones Radiofónicas Culturales, S.A. The station initially broadcast with 1,000 watts day and 250 watts night.

On November 4, 1994, XETAM was one of 83 stations that received a combo FM frequency.

On June 3, 2019, XETAM/XHTAM flipped from Ke Buena to romantic music as Romántica. It also began airing the syndicated Central FM morning newscast with Pedro Ferriz de Con.

References

Spanish-language radio stations
Radio stations in Ciudad Victoria